Tiger Lake is a lake in Redwood County, in the U.S. state of Minnesota.

According to Warren Upham, Tiger Lake was probably named on account of settlers seeing cougars in the area.

See also
List of lakes in Minnesota

References

Lakes of Minnesota
Lakes of Redwood County, Minnesota